Buffy the Vampire Slayer and Philosophy: Fear and Trembling in Sunnydale is a 2003 academic publication relating to the fictional Buffyverse established by two TV series, Buffy the Vampire Slayer and Angel.

Book description

Despite creator Joss Whedon's professed atheism, Buffy often dealt with religious and philosophical symbolism. The book is made up of a collection of essays that link classical philosophy to the Buffy show's ability to explore the underlying evil in everyday life through supernatural metaphor.

Contents

Books about the Buffyverse
2003 non-fiction books
Books about the media